Wickliffe Presbyterian Church is a historic church at 111 13th Avenue in Newark, Essex County, New Jersey, United States.  It is in Richardsonian Romanesque style and was designed by William Halsey Wood. It was built in 1889.

The 13th Avenue church replaced a church used previously by the congregation at 2 Wickliffe Street, in Newark.  Wickliffe Street intersects 13th Avenue a block or two away.

The church was added to the National Register of Historic Places in 1978.

The church was demolished for the University Heights Houses. It was located on 13th Ave near Boston and Richmond Streets. What remains is a facade with two placards of the Historical significance, one dated 1992.

See also 
 National Register of Historic Places listings in Essex County, New Jersey

References

External links
Flickr photo showing a portion remaining of the church, in 2005, showing a portion remaining after demolition reportedly around 1990
Wickliffe Presbyterian Church, at OldNewark.Com

Churches in Newark, New Jersey
Churches on the National Register of Historic Places in New Jersey
Churches completed in 1889
19th-century Presbyterian church buildings in the United States
Presbyterian churches in New Jersey
Romanesque Revival church buildings in New Jersey
Richardsonian Romanesque architecture in New Jersey
National Register of Historic Places in Newark, New Jersey